Allotinus unicolor, the lesser darkie, is a butterfly in the family Lycaenidae. It was described by Cajetan and Rudolf Felder in 1865. It is found in Asia.

Subspecies
A. u. unicolor (Burma, Thailand, Langkawi, Malay Peninsula, Tioman, Singapore, Borneo, Karimata, Lingga, Natuna)
A. u. aphocha Kheil, 1884 (Sumatra, Bangka, Batu, Mentawai, Nias)
A. u. continentalis Fruhstorfer, 1913 (Bangladesh and Assam to Burma and north-western Thailand)
A. u. georgius Fruhstorfer, 1913 (Philippines: Bohol)
A. u. moorei (H. H. Druce, 1895) (Borneo: Mount Kina Balu)
A. u. posidion Fruhstorfer, 1913 (Java, Bali, Lombok, Sumbawa, Engano)
A. u. rekkia Riley & Godfrey, 1921 (Burma, Thailand, Laos, possibly Vietnam)
A. u. zitema Fruhstorfer, 1916 (Sulawesi, Sula)

References

Butterflies described in 1865
Allotinus
Butterflies of Singapore
Butterflies of Borneo
Butterflies of Asia
Taxa named by Baron Cajetan von Felder
Taxa named by Rudolf Felder